Pujo is a commune in the Hautes-Pyrénées department in south-western France.

Pujo may also refer to:

Places
 Pujo-le-Plan, a commune in the Landes department in Aquitaine in south-western France
 Buyeo, also romanized as Pujo, an ancient Korean polity

People
 Arsène Pujo (1861–1939), American politician
 Pujo Committee, a US congressional subcommittee
 Maurice Pujo (1872–1955), French journalist and politician
 Pierre Pujo (1929–2007), leader of the French monarchist group Action Française

Other 
 Durga Puja, an annual Hindu festival